Crossfire Hurricane is a 2012 documentary film about the Rolling Stones written and directed by Brett Morgen. The film chronicles the early years of the band through to 1981. The film is a series of interviews conducted without cameras, while showing various points of interest that the band is discussing as archival footage. The title of the film comes from the first line of the band's 1968 hit "Jumpin' Jack Flash".

Synopsis 
On their 50th anniversary, the Rolling Stones, with the support of archive footage and interviewed by director Brett Morgen, retrace the first 20 years of their career. The film discusses their early success in the 1960s; the way the media characterised the difference between them and the Beatles; the exceptional musical talent of Brian Jones; their first song-writing; the difference between the boy fans' aggressiveness that resulted in fights with the police and the girl fans' screaming hysteria; Mick Jagger and Keith Richards drug use and their arrest; the musical contribution of Jones that was waning due to excessive use of drugs, and his death a few weeks after the separation from the band; Mick Taylor's debut concert in Hyde Park in memory of Jones and the return to world tours; the awful organization of the Altamont Free Concert; their flight to tax exile in 1971; the recording of Exile on Main St. in a villa on the south of France; Taylor's departure and the arrival of Ronnie Wood; and the arrest of Richards in Canada for possession of heroin and his decision to detox, to safeguard the future of the band.

Critical reception 
The film received mostly positive reviews. Review aggregator website Metacritic, which assigns normalized scores, gave the film a 77 out of 100, based on 17 critics.

John Anderson of The Wall Street Journal:

From James Poniewozik of Time magazine:

From David Hinckley of New York Daily News:

The film won a Golden Reel Award for Best Sound Editing: Long Form Documentary.

Charts

Certifications

References

External links 
 
 

2012 films
2012 documentary films
HBO documentary films
Rockumentaries
Films directed by Brett Morgen
Films produced by Mick Jagger
The Rolling Stones documentary films
2010s English-language films
2010s American films
2010s British films